For King and Another Country: Indian Soldiers on the Western Front, 1914–18 is a book about the Indian contributions to the British efforts in the First World War, written by Shrabani Basu and published in 2015.

References

External links

2015 non-fiction books
British non-fiction books
Bloomsbury Publishing books